New Zealand  women's national softball team, nicknamed the White Sox, is the women's national softball team for New Zealand. The "White Sox" name is one of many national team nicknames (indirectly) related to the All Blacks as well as to the famous Boston Red Sox and Chicago White Sox baseball teams.

The team competed at the 1990 ISF Women's World Championship in Normal, Illinois where they finished with 8 wins and 1 loss. The team competed at the 1994 ISF Women's World Championship in St. John's, Newfoundland where they finished sixth. The team competed at the 1998 ISF Women's World Championship in Fujinomiya City, Japan where they finished eleventh. The team competed at the 2002 ISF Women's World Championship in Saskatoon, Saskatchewan where they finished sixth.  The team competed at the 2006 ISF Women's World Championship in Beijing, China where they finished eleventh. The team competed at the 2010 ISF Women's World Championship in Caracas, Venezuela where they finished twelfth.

Results and fixtures
The following is a list of match results in the last 12 months, as well as any future matches that have been scheduled.

2022

Players

Current squad
The following players were called up for the 2024 Women's Softball World Cup group stage from 22–26 July 2023.

Lara Andrews (captain)
Amy Begg
Erin Blackmore
Rebecca Bromhead (vice-captain)
Meeki Cooper Nicola
Emma Francis
Shyah Hale
Tyneesha Houkamau
Nerissa McDowell
Tyla Morrison
Katrina Nukunuku
Loran Parker
Pallas Potter
Lace Tangianau
Otila Tavite
Brooke Whiteman

Competitive Record

Women's Softball World Cup

World Cup of Softball

Olympics

References

External links 
 International Softball Federation

Softball
Softball in New Zealand
Women's national softball teams